is a Japanese football manager and former player who is currently manager of Japan national football team. He made more than 250 appearances in 14 years with Sanfrecce Hiroshima, including a year on loan to Kyoto Purple Sanga, before spending his final season as a professional with Vegalta Sendai. He also played 35 times for the Japan national team. His brother Hiroshi and his sons Shohei and Keigo are also footballers.

Club career
Moriyasu was educated at and played for Nagasaki Nihon University High School. After finishing his school, he joined Japan Soccer League side Mazda in 1987. New manager Hans Ooft rated him highly and established him as an anchoring midfielder in the team. In April 1990, Moriyasu had a trial at Manchester United. When Japan's first ever professional league, J.League, started in 1993, Mazda was transformed to Sanfrecce Hiroshima for whom he continued to play. Together with Yahiro Kazama, he controlled Hiroshima's midfield and contributed to the club winning the second stage of the 1994 J1 League season.

In 1998, Ooft became the manager of Kyoto Purple Sanga and recruited Moriyasu on a loan deal. The deal was initially meant to be a permanent one but infuriated Hiroshima supporters collected signatures against the deal, which forced the clubs to settle for a loan. He was the linchpin of Kyoto for the 1998 season.

Moriyasu came back to Hiroshima for the 1999 season but find out his opportunities to play gradually decreasing mainly because of young Kazuyuki Morisaki's challenge for the place.

He was offered a coaching position at Hiroshima in 2002 but turned it down to continue to play. He moved to Vegalta Sendai and retired there at the end of the 2003 season.

International career
Ooft became the national coach of Japan national team in 1992. Ooft called up and played Moriyasu for his first match in charge against Argentina held on 31 May 1992 at the Tokyo National Stadium. Moriyasu was still a low-profile player at that time and many international teammates didn't know how to pronounce his name. What Ooft asked him to do throughout his reign was a simple task, to "win the ball and pass it to playmaker Ruy Ramos".

He was a member of the Japan team that won the 1992 Asian Cup and played all the Japan games except the final against Saudi Arabia for which he was ineligible due to suspension.

Under Ooft, Japan progressed to the 1994 World Cup qualification for the 1994 World Cup. Moriyasu was on the pitch when Japan's hope to play in the finals was dashed by an injury time Iraqi equaliser in the last qualifier, the match that the Japanese fans now refer to as the Agony of Doha.

He was capped 35 times between 1992 and 1996. He scored one goal for his country in a friendly against Australia on 10 February 1996.

Coaching career

Moriyasu served as a coach for Sanfrecce Hiroshima from the 2004 season. He also coached the Japan national youth team which participated in the 2006 AFC Youth Championship and the 2007 U-20 World Cup. He was a coach for the Hiroshima first team from 2007 to 2009 before a spell coaching at Albirex Niigata.

It was confirmed on 8 December 2011 that Moriyasu would return to Sanfrecce Hiroshima as manager for the 2012 season. Since then, he has won the J1 league title for both the 2012 season and the 2013 season. He left the club in July 2017 after poor results in the league campaign.

Moriyasu was the coach of the under-23 national team preparing for the 2020 Tokyo Olympics. He will stay on even as his duties were broadened by his new appointment.

Moriyasu assisted coach Akira Nishino in the last 16 in the recent World Cup finals in Russia. On 26 July 2018, with the current coach stepping down, the Japan Football Association appointed Hajime Moriyasu as the new coach of the men's national team, with an eye to the World Cup in 2022. He led Japan to the 2019 AFC Asian Cup Final after defeated Iran 3–0 at semi-finals, but was defeated at the final 3–1 to Qatar to mark Japan's first defeat at a continental final.

Personal life
Moriyasu's son, Keigo Moriyasu, played as a striker for Edgeworth FC in the National Premier Leagues Northern NSW in Australia. Another son Shohei also played football professionally for J2 League side Kamatamare Sanuki.

Club statistics

National team statistics

Managerial statistics

Honors and awards

Player
Japan
AFC Asian Cup (1): 1992

Manager
Sanfrecce Hiroshima
J1 League (3): 2012, 2013, 2015
Japanese Super Cup (3): 2013, 2014, 2016

Japan

EAFF E-1 Football Championship: 2022

Individual
J.League Manager of the Year (3): 2012, 2013, 2015

References

External links
 
 
 Japan National Football Team Database
 
 

1968 births
Living people
Association football people from Shizuoka Prefecture
Japanese footballers
Japan international footballers
Japan Soccer League players
J1 League players
Sanfrecce Hiroshima players
Kyoto Sanga FC players
Vegalta Sendai players
1992 AFC Asian Cup players
1995 King Fahd Cup players
AFC Asian Cup-winning players
Japanese football managers
J1 League managers
Sanfrecce Hiroshima managers
People from Kakegawa, Shizuoka
Association football midfielders
2019 AFC Asian Cup managers
2019 Copa América managers
2022 FIFA World Cup managers